Hornsea Town railway station was a railway station which served the town of Hornsea in the East Riding of Yorkshire, England. It was the terminus of the Hull and Hornsea Railway.

It opened with the rest of the line on 28 March 1864, it was originally named just "Hornsea".

The station originally had one platform adjacent to the station building with a canopy over the platform. There was a turntable, a signal box and two goods sidings. By 1910 there was an additional double sided platform and long sidings.

The station was renamed – with the "Town" suffix – on 25 September 1950, and closed on 19 October 1964.

Two camping coaches were positioned here by the North Eastern Region from 1959 to 1964.

Hornsea Town railway station is now a Grade II listed building.

References

External links

 
 Hornsea station on navigable 1947 O. S. map

Former North Eastern Railway (UK) stations
Disused railway stations in the East Riding of Yorkshire
Grade II listed buildings in the East Riding of Yorkshire
Beeching closures in England
Hull and Hornsea Railway
Railway stations in Great Britain opened in 1864
Railway stations in Great Britain closed in 1964
Hornsea
Grade II listed railway stations